Bryn Avon is a historic estate and national historic district located near Etowah, Henderson County, North Carolina. Bryn Avon house was built about 1884-1886 and updated in the 1910-1920s in the Tudor Revival style.  It is a -story, stone and half-timbered manor house. Other contributing resources include the estate landscape and terraced garden and four smaller family cottages: the Mallett Cottage (c. 1925); the Brown house playhouse (c. 1932); Yon Way-the Conrow cottage (c. 1920–1925) and Mr. Conrow's studio (c. 1925–1935); and the Bellamy Cottage (c. 1933–1938).

It was listed on the National Register of Historic Places in 1999.

References

Houses on the National Register of Historic Places in North Carolina
Historic districts on the National Register of Historic Places in North Carolina
Tudor Revival architecture in North Carolina
Houses completed in 1920
Buildings and structures in Henderson County, North Carolina
National Register of Historic Places in Henderson County, North Carolina